Ferruccio Vitale (1875-1933) was a landscape architect. Born in Italy, he became a United States citizen in 1921. The historian Terry R. Schnadelbach considered him to be "America's forgotten landscape architect."

Life

Vitale was born in Florence, Italy on February 5, 1875, the son of Lazzaro Vitale and his wife, the Countess Giuseppina Barbaro Vitale. The father was an engineer, and in 1893, the son graduated from the Royal military school in Modena with a degree in engineering. After graduating, he enlisted as an officer in the Italian army. Vitale moved to Washington, DC, in 1898 in his role of military attache to the Italian embassy. Resigning from this position, he later studied to become a landscape designer in Florence, Turin and Paris. In 1902, he moved from Genoa to New York, where he joined the firm of Parsons & Pentecost as a landscape architect. In 1908, he formed a partnership with Alfred Geiffert, and in 1911, he acquired his first major commission: the Red Maples estate in Southampton, New York.

Vitale was a member of the American Society of Landscape Architects (he became a fellow in 1908), the Architectural League of New York, and the Municipal Art Society. He served on the Fine Arts Commission of New York City, the American Academy in Rome, and the Foundation for Architecture and Landscape Architecture. He was an honorary member of the American Institute of Architects, and belonged to various New York social clubs.

In 1920, the Architectural League of New York awarded Vitale, Brinckerhoff and Geiffert its first gold medal for landscape architecture.

Ferruccio Vitale died of pneumonia in 1933.

Works
Millrose, Rodman Wanamaker Estate, Jenkintown, Pennsylvania, 1907
Westbrook Farm, Estate of Charles I. Hudson, Long Island, 1907-1916
Red Maples, Mrs. Alfred M. Hoyt Residence, Southampton, Long Island, 1911-1913
Cherrycroft, Estate of Dudley Olcott, New Jersey, 1911-1912
Brookside, Estate of William Hall Walker, Great Barrington, Massachusetts, 1912-1918. "Ferruccio Vitale created for Mr. Walker his Walled Garden, it was unhesitatingly pronounced one of the gems of this country"
Longwood, Estate of Pierre S. du Pont, Kennett Square, Pennsylvania, 1915
The Oasis, Estate of Francis E. Dreary, Cleveland, Ohio, 1916-1917
Villa Carola and Trillora Court, Estates of Isaac Guggenheim and Solomon R. Guggenheim, Port Washington, Long Island, 1916-1924
Allgates, Estate of Horatio Gates Lloyd, Haverford, Pennsylvania
Rosemary, Estate of Jay F. Carlisle, Long Island, 1917-1921
The Bather, Estate of Carl J. Schmidlapp, Mill Neck, Long Island, 1920
Inisfada, Estate of Nicholas F. Bradly, Long Island, 1920-1924
Centaurs, Estate of Alfred E. Hamill, Illinois, 1920-1927
Villa Virginia, Estate of William H. Clarke, Stockbridge, Massachusetts, 1921
Arthur Vining Davis Estate, Oyster Bay, Long Island, 1922
Century Country Club, New York, 1922-1923
Underhill Farm, Estate of Myron Charles Taylor, Locust Valley, Long Island, 1922-1924
Chelsea, Estate of Benjamin and Alexandra Emery Moore, Long Island, 1924
Mrs. I. Dodge Sloane Estate, Long Island, c. 1924
Edward Schwab Estate, New Jersey, c. 1924
Garden Village, Master Plan for Scarsdale, New York, 1924-1926
Village Green for Town Bettermerst, House and Garden, June 1926
Airdrie House, Estate of Edwin A. Fish, Locust Valley, Long Island, 1926-1927
Thorneham, Estate of Landon Ketchum Thorne, Long Island, 1926-1932
Richard B. and Jenny King Mellon Estate, Pittsburgh, Pennsylvania, 1927
Cherrywood, Estate of John A. Victor, Locust Valley, Long Island, 1927-1928
Donald Grant Gaddes Estate, Glen Cove, Long Island, 1927-1930
Four Winds, Estate of Gerald Beekman Hoppin, Oyster Bay Cove, Long Island, 1927-1932
South Campus, University of Illinois, Illinois, 1928-1931
Anthony Campagna Estate, Riverdale, New York, 1929-1934
Sandy Cay, Estate of Condé Montrose Nast, Long Island, 1930
Zalmon G. Simmons Estate, Greenwich, Connecticut, 1930
Ca Sole, Estate of Horace and Jean Schmidlapp, Cincinnati, Ohio, 1930
Mrs. Kersey Coates Reed Estate, Lake Forest, Illinois, 1930
Washington Monument Gardens, Washington, D.C., 1930-1931
Century of Progress Exposition, Chicago, Illinois, 1930-1934
National Mall, Washington, D.C., 1932
Meridian Hill Park, Washington, D.C., 1932
Francis J. Allen Residence, Greenwich, Connecticut, 1932-1934
Skylands Farm, Estate of Clarence McKenzie Lewis, New Jersey, 1932-1933
National Gallery of Art, Washington, D.C., 1932-1940
Canterbury Farm, Estate of Albert E. Pierce, Virginia, 1933-1934
Exhibition Gardens, American Radiator and Standard Sanitary Corporation, Century of Progress Exposition, Chicago, Illinois, 1934
Women in Military Service for America Memorial, Memorial Avenue at the entrance to Arlington National Cemetery in Arlington County, Virginia

Gallery

References

1875 births
1933 deaths
American landscape architects
Deaths from pneumonia in New York (state)
Italian emigrants to the United States